The 25th Canadian Infantry Brigade was Canada's primary combat-formation intending to be sent as part of the British Commonwealth Forces Korea. Originally composed of three infantry battalions and two armoured squadrons, several individual units rotated through the brigade. Although a full brigade had been trained and armed by 1951, the success of the Inchon Landing meant that only 2nd Battalion, Princess Patricia's Canadian Light Infantry (2PPCLI) was initially sent.  However, Chinese and North Korean forces subjected Canadian forces to fierce fighting throughout April 1951. 2PPCLI earned a Presidential Unit Citation for their actions during the Battle of Kapyong while serving with the 27th British Commonwealth Brigade. It had detached from the 25th Brigade in order to leave for Korea in advance of the formation, and would later rejoin its Canadian brigade group.

Formation
When North Korea invaded their southern neighbour on 25 June 1950, the UN Security Council authorized member-nations to "...furnish such assistance to the Republic of Korea as may be necessary to repel the armed attack and to restore international peace and security in the area". Although the United States sent immediate military aid to South Korea, Canada did not initially prepare to send ground forces to the country (although three Royal Canadian Navy destroyers were present for a majority of the campaign). On 7 August 1950, Canada's government authorized the creation of the "Canadian Army Special Force". Originally, it was to comprise an armoured regiment, and the 2nd Battalions of each of Canada's permanent-force infantry regiments – Princess Patricia's Canadian Light Infantry, Royal Canadian Regiment, and Royal 22e Régiment – placed under the overall command of Brigadier-General J.M. Rockingham.

Initial operations in Korea
Due to the massive success of the Inchon Landings, only the 2nd Battalion of Princess Patricia's was initially sent to Yokohama, and then onto Korea.  By the time the transports arrived in Japan, however, the situation had changed significantly.  China had sent substantial forces to the aid of North Korea, pushing UN-forces back into South Korea.  As a result, the PPCLI was sent directly to the front lines, located near Seoul, in mid–February.  The first contact made with North Korean and Chinese forces came at the end of that month.  In early March, United Nations forces initiated a counteroffensive against Chinese forces, while the Canadians moved into the Kapyong Valley near the 38th Parallel.

Battle of Kapyong
In April 1951, the Chinese People's Liberation Army launched a series of massive offensives across the Korean front, with the intention of recapturing Seoul.  American and South Korean forces quickly began to retreat, with Canadian and Australian forces holding Kapyong Valley, preventing Chinese forces from overwhelming the UN in Korea.

Order of battle
25th Canadian Infantry Brigade Brigade HQ
2nd Battalion, The Royal Canadian Regiment
2nd Battalion, Princess Patricia's Canadian Light Infantry
2nd Battalion, Royal 22e Régiment
C Squadron, Lord Strathcona's Horse (Royal Canadians) (2nd Armoured Regiment)
2nd Regiment, Royal Canadian Horse Artillery
57th Independent Field Squadron, Royal Canadian Engineers
25th Canadian Infantry Brigade Signal Troop 
No. 25 Canadian Infantry Brigade Ordnance Company
No. 25 Canadian Field Ambulance
No. 54 Canadian Transport Company and No. 38 Canadian Mobile Ambulance Company

Note: The 2nd Battalion, Princess Patricia's Canadian Light Infantry, was deployed in 1950.  The brigade was deployed to Korea deployed in 1951 made up of the units listed here. Units were rotated as the war progressed. The Korean War Veterans' Associate (KVA) maintains a complete list of Canadian units both before and after the armistice.

See also
 United Nations Memorial Cemetery, in Busan, Korea, where 378 Canadian soldiers are buried.

Footnotes

References
Berton, Pierre (2001). Marching As to War. Anchor Canada. 
Zuehlke, Mark (2001). The Canadian Military Atlas. Stoddart. .
Canadian Order of Battle in Korea, kvacanada.com

Brigades of the Canadian Army
Infantry brigades of the Canadian Army
1951 establishments in Canada
1955 disestablishments in Canada
Military units and formations established in 1951
Military units and formations disestablished in 1955
Military units and formations of Canada in the Korean War